Vilmos Kertész (21 March 1890 – 15 September 1962) was a Hungarian international Olympian footballer. He played alongside his two brothers, Gyula and Adolf.

Early life
Kertész was born in Budapest, Hungary, and was Jewish.

Career
Kertész played club football at the inside right and midfield positions for MTK Budapest from 1908 to 1924. He played alongside his two brothers, Gyula and Adolf. He was a midfielder for NSC Budapest from 1924 to 1926.

He played international football for the Hungary national football team, where he earned a total of 47 caps, scoring 11 goals. Kertész also participated at the 1912 Summer Olympics and the 1924 Summer Olympics.

Kertész coached Ékszerész SC, Budapesti Vasas SC (1926–30), and Ripensia Timişoara (1931-32).

See also
List of Jewish footballers

References

External links

Vilmos Kertesz at JewsInSports.org

1890 births
1962 deaths
Footballers from Budapest
Hungarian footballers
Hungary international footballers
Olympic footballers of Hungary
Footballers at the 1912 Summer Olympics
Footballers at the 1924 Summer Olympics
MTK Budapest FC players
Jewish footballers
Hungarian Jews
Association football midfielders
Association football inside forwards
Vasas SC managers
FC Ripensia Timișoara
Hungarian football managers